Tina Louise Orwall (born April 3, 1965) is an American politician serving as the Speaker pro tempore of the Washington House of Representatives since 2021, a position she previously held from 2017 to 2018. A member of the Democratic Party, she is a member of the Washington House of Representatives, representing the 33rd district since 2009.

Career
Orwall served as a clinical social worker focused on serving people with mental illness.

References

1965 births
21st-century American politicians
21st-century American women politicians
Living people
Democratic Party members of the Washington House of Representatives
Women state legislators in Washington (state)